Joseph Wayne Mercer (February 25, 1845 – March 13, 1906) was a U.S. politician from Missouri.

Biography
Mercer was born in Platte City, Missouri. He attended Chapel Hill College in Lafayette County, Missouri. During the American Civil War, he served in Confederate Army, and was wounded at the battles of Lexington, Pea Ridge, Pine Bluff, losing his right arm in the latter. Following the war, he moved to Independence, Missouri, where he was a schoolteacher.

Entering politics, he was elected to the Independence City Council, and later served as Treasurer of Jackson County, Missouri. From 1875 to 1877, he served as State Treasurer of Missouri. Following his term as state treasurer, he returned to Independence, where he worked in the banking and grocery industries. In 1892, he was elected to one term as mayor of Independence. Ten years later, he became county judge for the Eastern District of Jackson County.

Notes

 

1845 births
1906 deaths
State treasurers of Missouri
Mayors of places in Missouri
Missouri Democrats
Politicians from Independence, Missouri
People from Platte City, Missouri
Confederate States Army soldiers
People of Missouri in the American Civil War
American amputees
American politicians with disabilities